The Central District of Tuyserkan County is a district (bakhsh) in Tuyserkan County, Hamadan Province, Iran. At the 2006 census, its population was 88,251, in 24,004 families.  The District has two cities: Tuyserkan and Sarkan.  The District has four rural districts (dehestan): Hayaquq-e Nabi Rural District, Khorram Rud Rural District, Korzan Rud Rural District, and Seyyed Shahab Rural District.

References 

Tuyserkan County
Districts of Hamadan Province